In June 2014, the Scotland rugby union team played single test matches against four countries; Argentina, Canada, South Africa and the United States. The opening three tests, United States, Canada and Argentina, coincided with the June international window, whereas the test against South Africa fell outside the international window. This meant players playing outside Scotland at club level were not permitted to be released by their clubs to represent Scotland against South Africa; Scotland effectively picked two separate squads, one for the USA and Canada games, the other for Argentina and South Africa.

The tour was the start of Vern Cotter's period in charge. Head coach Andy Robinson had resigned in November 2012, and the Scottish Rugby Union had appointed the subsequent interim coach Scott Johnson as Director of Rugby. Scotland lost their match to South Africa but won all three of their Americas tests.

Fixtures

Squads
On 20 May, Head Coach Vern Cotter named two squads for the tour; a 27-man squad for the North America leg and a 25-man squad for the Argentina-South Africa leg - 9 players were initially named in both squads. The reasoning was for Cotter to look at as many players as possible. It also meant that players playing outside Scotland at club level, were not selected in the Argentina-South Africa squad, which was predominantly made up of Glasgow Warriors and Edinburgh Rugby players.

Jack Cuthbert, Matt Scott, Ross Rennie and Ryan Wilson were not considered due to injury.

Head coach:  Vern Cotter

North America leg
On 1 June, Grayson Hart was added to the North America squad, in addition to the Argentina-South Africa squad, to cover the injured Chris Cusiter. While Mark Bennett was also added to the North America squad to cover the injured Alex Dunbar, who was ruled out of whole tour.

On 2 June, Tom Heathcote and Ruaridh Jackson swapped positions on tour. Jackson was moved to the North America squad, and Heathcote was moved to the Argentina-South Africa squad.

On 9 June, Tim Swinson and Peter Horne were added to the North America squad, in addition to the Argentina-South Africa squad, to cover the injured Duncan Taylor and Jim Hamilton.

Note: Caps and ages are to pre United States match - 7 June 2014.

Argentina-South Africa leg
On 2 June, Tom Heathcote and Ruaridh Jackson swapped positions on tour. Jackson was moved to the North America squad, and Heathcote was moved to the Argentina-South Africa squad.

On 15 June, Kieran Low and Blair Cowan was added to the Argentina-South Africa squad to face Argentina to cover the injured Kelly Brown and Alasdair Strokosch, who were under assessment to feature in the Argentina match.

On 16 June, Nick De Luca was added to the Argentina-South Africa squad to cover the backs.

On 21 June, Adam Ashe, Tyrone Holmes and Euan Murray were added to the squad ahead of the final tour match against South Africa.

Note: Caps and ages are to pre Argentina match - 20 June 2014.

Matches

United States

Notes:
 Danny Barrett made his international debut for the United States.
 Alex Allan, Blair Cowan, Gordon Reid and Finn Russell made their international debuts for Scotland.

Canada

Notes:
 Kevin Bryce and Grayson Hart made their international debuts for Scotland.

Argentina

Notes:
 Matías Moroni made his international debut for Argentina.

South Africa

Notes:
 Marnitz Boshoff, Stephan Lewies, Marcel van der Merwe, Oupa Mohojé and Handré Pollard made their international debuts for South Africa.
 Adam Ashe and Tyrone Holmes made their international debuts for Scotland.

Statistics
Key
Con: Conversions
Pen: Penalties
DG: Drop goals
Pts: Points

Scotland Statistics

Tour statistics

See also
 2014 mid-year rugby union internationals
 Mid-year rugby union tests
 History of rugby union matches between Argentina and Scotland
 History of rugby union matches between Scotland and South Africa

References

External links
 Scotland Rugby Team – the official site of the Scotland national team

2014
2014 rugby union tours
Americas and South Africa
2014
2014
2014
2014
2014 in American rugby union
2014 in Canadian rugby union
2014 in Argentine rugby union